Ferrissia is a genus of small, air-breathing freshwater limpets, aquatic gastropod mollusks in the family Planorbidae, the ram's horn snails and their allies.

Species
Species within the genus Ferrissia include:
 Ferrissia baconi (Bourguignat, 1853)
 Ferrissia beaui (Bourguignat, 1853) - Beau's Stream Limpet
 Ferrissia burnupi (Walker, 1912)
 Ferrissia cawstoni Walker, 1924
 Ferrissia ceylanica Benson, 1864
 Ferrissia chudeaui Germain, 1917
 Ferrissia clifdeni Connolly, 1939
 Ferrissia connollyi (Walker, 1912)
 † Ferrissia crenellata Harzhauser & Neubauer in Harzhauser et al., 2012 
 † Ferrissia deperdita (Desmarest, 1814) 
 † Ferrissia dimici (Brusina, 1902) 
 Ferrissia dohrnianus (Clessin, 1882)
 Ferrissia eburnensis Binder, 1957
 Ferrissia farquhari (Walker, 1924)
 Ferrissia fontinalis (Walker, 1912)
 Ferrissia fragilis (Tryon, 1863) - synonyms: Ferrissia clessiniana (Jickeli, 1882), Ferrissia wautieri (Mirolli, 1960) - Fragile Ancylid
 Ferrissia gentilis Lanzer, 1991
 † Ferrissia illyrica (Neumayr, 1880) 
 Ferrissia irrorata (Guilding, 1828)
 Ferrissia isseli (Bourguignat, 1866)
 Ferrissia junodi Connolly, 1925
 Ferrissia kavirondica (Mandahl-Barth, 1954)
 Ferrissia lacustris Walker, 1924
 Ferrissia leonensis Connolly, 1928
 Ferrissia lhotelleriei Walker, 1914 - dubious species
 Ferrissia mcneili Walker, 1925 - hood ancylid
 Ferrissia modesta Crosse, 1880
 Ferrissia natalensis Walker, 1924
 Ferrissia neozelanica (Suter, 1905)
 † Ferrissia neumayri (Fontannes, 1881) 
 Ferrissia pallaryi Walker, 1914 - dubious species
 Ferrissia parallela (Haldeman) - oblong ancylid or Ferrissia parallelus
 Ferrissia petterdi (Johnston, 1879)
 † Ferrissia pontileviensis (Morgan, 1920)  
 Ferrissia siamensis Brandt, 1974
 Ferrissia rivularis (Say, 1817) - the type species
 Ferrissia tasmanica  (Woods, 1876)
 Ferrissia tanganyicensis (Smith, 1906)
 Ferrissia tenuis (Bourguignat, 1862)
 Ferrissia toroensis (Mandahl-Barth, 1954)
 † Ferrissia truci Wautier, 1975 
 Ferrissia verruca (Benson, 1855)
 Ferrissia victoriensis (Walker, 1912)
 Ferrissia viola (Annandale & Prashad, 1921)
 Ferrissia walkeri (Pilsbry & Ferriss, 1907)
 † Ferrissia wittmanni (Schlickum, 1964) 
 Ferrissia zambesiensis (Walker, 1912)
 Ferrissia zambiensis Mandahl-Barth, 1968

Many specific names need revision, for example 11 species of Ferrissia in southern Africa.
Species brought into synonymy
 † Ferrissia senckenbergiana (Boettger, 1877): synonym of  † Ferrissia deperdita (Desmarest, 1814) 
 Ferrissia wautieri (Mirolli, 1960): synonym of Ferrissia fragilis (Tryon, 1836)
 Ferrissia (Pettancylus) clessiniana (Jickeli, 1882): synonym of Pettancylus clessiniana (Jickeli, 1882)

References

External links
 Greke K. (2011). "First record of the genus Ferrissia Walker, 1903 (Gastropoda: Planorbidae) from the Papuan region". In: Telnov D. Biodiversity, Biogeography and Nature Conservation in Wallacea and New Guinea. Volume I., The Entomological Society of Latvia, Riga, 526 pp.

Planorbidae
Taxonomy articles created by Polbot